The Nowitna River is a  tributary of the Yukon River in the U.S. state of Alaska. Major tributaries include the Titna, Big Mud, Little Mud, Lost, and Sulatna rivers.

The designation means that most of the Nowitna is unpolluted, free-flowing, and generally inaccessible except by trail.

Boating
It is possible to run the Nowitna in many kinds of boats, including hard-shell, folding, or inflatable canoes and kayaks or inflatable rafts. Most of the river is slow-moving and meandering, rated Class I (easy) on the International Scale of River Difficulty. The exception occurs in Nowitna Canyon between Mastodon Creek and Big Mud River along the middle reaches of the Nowitna. This segment includes Class II (medium) rapids.

Dangers include black bears as well as rapids. Navigating can be difficult at times because of upriver winds, especially on the lower reaches.

See also
List of National Wild and Scenic Rivers
List of rivers of Alaska

References

External links

Nowitna National Wildlife Refuge – U.S. Fish and Wildlife Service

Rivers of Alaska
Rivers of Yukon–Koyukuk Census Area, Alaska
Wild and Scenic Rivers of the United States
Tributaries of the Yukon River
Rivers of Unorganized Borough, Alaska